The Pueblo V Period (AD 1600 to present) is the final period of ancestral puebloan culture in the American Southwest, or Oasisamerica, and includes the contemporary Pueblo peoples.  From the previous Pueblo IV Period, all 19 of the Rio Grande valley pueblos remain in the contemporary period. The only remaining pueblo in Texas is Ysleta del Sur Pueblo, and the only remaining pueblos in Arizona are maintained by the Hopi Tribe. The rest of the Pueblo IV pueblos were abandoned by the 19th century.

The Pueblo V Period (Pecos Classification) is similar to the "Regressive Pueblo Period."

History
Considerable change occurred during the Pueblo V Period due to Spanish colonization of the Americas beginning in the 16th century and the United States westward expansion of the 19th and 20th centuries.  These influences resulted in:
 Population decline due to European diseases
 Efforts to secure traditional Pueblo lands by the Europeans and other Native American tribes
 Establishment of Indian reservations

The Crow Canyon Archaeological Center notes, "Today, Pueblo people live in the modern world while maintaining their distinct culture and rich traditional heritage."

Cultural groups and periods
The cultural groups of this period include:
 Ancestral Puebloans – southern Utah, southern Colorado, northern Arizona and northern and central New Mexico.
 Hohokam – southern Arizona.
 Mogollon – southeastern Arizona, southern New Mexico and northern Mexico.
 Patayan – western Arizona, California, and Baja California.

Notable abandoned sites
The people from the following sites abandoned their pueblos and generally blended into Puebloans societies in the Rio Grande valley of New Mexico:
 Bailey Ruin – Arizona
 Bandelier – New Mexico
 Casa Grande – Arizona
 Mesa Grande – Arizona
 Pueblo Grande – Arizona
 Pecos – New Mexico, abandoned in the 19th century
 Puye Cliff Dwellings – New Mexico

Federally recognized Pueblos
There are 21 federally recognized Pueblos that are home to Pueblo people.

Gallery

See also
 American Indian Wars in the Southwest
 Pueblo – modern and ancient pueblos
 Pueblo Revolt of 1680
 Puebloan peoples

Notes

References 

Native American history of Arizona
Native American history of Colorado
Native American history of Nevada
Native American history of New Mexico
Native American history of Utah
Oasisamerica cultures
Pueblo history
Southwest periods in North America by Pecos classification